Robert Neel Proctor (born 1954) is an American historian of science and Professor of the History of Science at Stanford University, where he is also Professor by courtesy of Pulmonary Medicine. While a professor of the history of science at Pennsylvania State University in 1999, he became the first historian to testify against the tobacco industry.

Career 

Robert N. Proctor graduated from Indiana University Bloomington in 1976 with a Bachelor of Science in biology. He then took up studies at Harvard University, earning master's and doctoral degrees in History of Science in 1977 and 1984, respectively.

At Pennsylvania State University, he and his wife, Londa Schiebinger, co-directed the Science, Medicine and Technology in Culture Program for nine years.

Proctor has worked on human origins and the history of evolution, including changing interpretations of the oldest tools. His 2003 Three Roots of Human Recency won the 2004/2005 Award for Exemplary Interdisciplinary Anthropological Research from the American Anthropological Association. In his Three Roots article he exposed the racism implicit in celebrating "leaving Africa" as a fundamental stage in human evolution (which he mocks as “out of Africa, thank God”); one of the points of this article was to show that anthropological ideas of human origins—including efforts to answer the question "when did humans become human?"—have been scarred by changing notions of race. Race was also the focus of his 1988 book Racial Hygiene: Medicine Under the Nazis, which identified the Nazi regime as a monstrous effort to create a biomedical utopia.  Hitler was celebrated as "the doctor of the German people" and physicians joined the SS in great numbers than any other professional group.  Proctor detailed how racial theorists in Nazi Germany were inspired by eugenicists operating in the United States,  including men like Madison Grant and Harry Laughlin, and that one reason the Nazis mandated sterilization of "the unfit" and bans on racial intermarriage was to prevent the US from becoming “the world’s racial leader.”  As of 2021, his Racial Hygiene has been cited nearly 2000 times, according to Google Scholar. However, Robert Proctor is perhaps best known for his groundbreaking 2012 history of the tobacco industry, "Golden Holocaust: Origins of the Cigarette Catastrophe and the Case for Abolition", winner of the Rachel Carson Prize in 2014.

His 2008 book "Agnotology: The Making and Unmaking of Ignorance", co-edited with Londa Schiebinger, examines the concept of Agnotology", a term coined by linguist Iain Boal in 1992  to describe the study of intentionally induced ignorance or doubt, particularly the publication of intentionally inaccurate or misleading scientific data.

Proctor is currently writing another book on this topic, Agate Eyes: A Lapidary Journey': "By contrast with diamonds or asbestos or granite or the minerals we burn for fuel, the lowly agate is the victim of scientific disinterest, the same kinds of structured apathy I have elsewhere called 'the social construction of ignorance.' Agates seem to fall outside the orbit of geological knowledge, and therefore tend to be regarded — if at all — as geological accidents or oddities not really deserving systematic study."

A central theme in Proctor’s work is the history of race and racism, a focus of his career already in the 1970s, when he taught The changing concept of race'' with Nathan Huggins and Barbara Rosenkrantz in the African American Studies department at Harvard. In 2008, Proctor served as an expert witness in a wrongful death suit against Philip Morris and used the n-word in his testimony, triggering a mistrial. Later, in 2019, Proctor again drew scrutiny for repeatedly saying the racial slur aloud when quoting from cigarette advertisements in a guest lecture at Stanford Law School. He responded to this backlash with, "I didn't 'use' the N-word in my lecture, I showed and cited its use in three different brands of cigarettes sold in the middle decades of the twentieth century."

Personal life
He is the longtime partner of fellow historian of science Londa Schiebinger, whom he met at Harvard. They have two sons together, named Geoffrey Schiebinger and Jonathan Proctor. Before having children, the couple decided they would have two and each would receive one of their surnames.

Bibliography

Prizes and fellowships
Fellow of the American Academy of Arts and Sciences, 2002-Present
Visiting scholar, Hamburger Institut für Sozialforschung, Hamburg, Germany, 1995
Senior Scholar in Residence, U.S. Holocaust Research Institute, Holocaust Memorial Museum, Washington, D.C., 1994
Visiting Fellow, Shelby Collum Davis Center for Historical Studies, Princeton, 1992-1993
Research grant, National Center for Human Genome Research, National Institutes of Health, 1992-1993
Penn State Distinguished Scholar Medal Recipient, 1997.

See also
 Tobacco industry

References

External links

The Agateer
Anti-Agate: The Great Diamond Hoax and the Semiprecious Stone Scam
Nazi Medicine and Public Health Policy
Rendez-vous with Robert Proctor
The anti-tobacco campaign of the Nazis: a little known aspect of public health in Germany, 1933-45
Commentary: Schairer and Schöniger's forgotten tobacco epidemiology and the Nazi quest for racial purity
Historical Reconstruction of Tobacco and Health in the U.S., 1954-1994
 The man who studies the spread of ignorance - Gerorgina Kenyon, BBC, 6 January 2016
 Robert N. Proctor

1954 births
Living people
Harvard University alumni
Indiana University alumni
Pennsylvania State University faculty
Stanford University Department of History faculty
Historians of science
21st-century American historians
21st-century American male writers
American male non-fiction writers